Emina Asimovna Malagich (born 29 August 1995) is a Russian short track speed skater. She competed in the women's 500 metres at the 2018 Winter Olympics. She is of Bosnia and Herzegovina descent.

References

External links

1995 births
Living people
Russian female short track speed skaters
Russian people of Bosnia and Herzegovina descent
Olympic short track speed skaters of Russia
Short track speed skaters at the 2018 Winter Olympics
Speed skaters from Moscow
Universiade gold medalists for Russia
Universiade silver medalists for Russia
Universiade medalists in short track speed skating
Competitors at the 2013 Winter Universiade
Competitors at the 2019 Winter Universiade
21st-century Russian women